Headrush may refer to:
 Vertigo (medical), a medical symptom of a balance disorder
 Orthostatic hypotension, a sudden drop in blood pressure and coordination when a person stands up too quickly
 Headrush (film), a 2003 Irish film starring Steven Berkoff
 Head Rush (TV series), a 2010 Discovery show
 Headrush EP, by the band Creaming Jesus
 HeadRush, a spinoff of the PC CD-ROM game You Don't Know Jack
 "Headrush", a song on the 2015 album Walk the Plank by Zebrahead
 "Headrush", a song on the 2018 album What Happens Next by Joe Satriani